Nils Erik Flakstad may refer to:
 Nils Erik Flakstad (politician)
 Nils Erik Flakstad (sculptor)